Natural cytotoxicity triggering receptor 1 is a protein that in humans is encoded by the NCR1 gene. NCR1 has also been designated as CD335 (cluster of differentiation,  NKP46, NKp46, NK-p46, and LY94.

References

Further reading

External links
 
 

Clusters of differentiation
Human proteins